The Summer Slaughter Tour is an annual heavy metal music tour held every year since 2007. It originated in North America in 2007 and has toured in Canada in 2008, Europe in 2008, and Australia and New Zealand in 2009. Billed as "The Most Extreme Tour of the Year", Summer Slaughter has earned a reputation as being one of the few summer tours to cater exclusively to fans of extreme forms of metal music. Starting in 2012, Summer Slaughter began to add more progressive metal bands to their lineups, seeing Between the Buried and Me co-headline with Cannibal Corpse. Periphery also played Summer Slaughter 2012, and came back during Summer Slaughter 2013, along with progressive metal bands Animals as Leaders and The Ocean. The focus on progressive metal that year was controversial and many people were "into" heavy metal music, and death metal focused lineups returned in 2014, seeing Morbid Angel headline.

2007
Headliner:
Necrophagist
Supporting bands:
Decapitated
Cephalic Carnage
Cattle Decapitation
The Faceless
As Blood Runs Black
Arsis
Ion Dissonance
Beneath the Massacre
Daath (June 3–10)

Tour dates

2008

Headliner:
The Black Dahlia Murder
Supporting bands:
Kataklysm
Vader
Cryptopsy
The Faceless
Despised Icon
Aborted
Born of Osiris
Psycroptic
Whitechapel

Tour dates:

2008 (Canada)

Headliner:
Necrophagist
Support bands:
Brutal Truth (Toronto only)
Dying Fetus
Beneath The Massacre
Into Eternity
Neuraxis
Whitechapel
Veil of Maya
Divinity
Common Grave

Tour dates

2008 (Europe)

Headliner:
Suicide Silence
Supporting bands:
As Blood Runs Black
Abigail Williams
Born of Osiris
Annotations of an Autopsy
The Berzerker

Tour dates

2009 (Australia/New Zealand)
Headliner:
Necrophagist
Supporting bands:
Dying Fetus
Aborted
The Red Shore (withdrew)
The Faceless
Dawn of Azazel (New Zealand only)
Ulcerate (New Zealand only)

Tour dates

2009

Headliners:
 Necrophagist 
 Suffocation (until 7/3 but also played 7/19)
 Behemoth (replaced Suffocation on 5, 6 and 7 July)
Supporting bands:
 Darkest Hour
 Winds of Plague
 Dying Fetus (until 7/14)
 Born of Osiris
 Origin
 After the Burial
 Beneath the Massacre
 Blackguard
 Decrepit Birth (second half of tour only June 28 – July 20)
 Ensiferum (second half of tour only June 28 – July 20)

Tour dates:

2010

Headliner:
Decapitated
Supporting bands:
The Faceless
All Shall Perish
The Red Chord
Veil of Maya
Decrepit Birth
Cephalic Carnage
Carnifex
Animals As Leaders
Vital Remains

Tour dates:

2010 (Mexico)

Headliners
Job for a Cowboy

Support bands
Winds of Plague
The Faceless
The Acacia Strain
As Blood Runs Black
Veil of Maya

Tour dates

2011

Headliners: 
The Black Dahlia Murder
Whitechapel
Supporting bands:
Darkest Hour
Six Feet Under
Dying Fetus
The Faceless (Texas dates only)
As Blood Runs Black
Oceano
Fleshgod Apocalypse
Powerglove
Within the Ruins

Tour dates:

2012

Headliners: 
Cannibal Corpse
Between the Buried and Me
Supporting bands:
The Faceless 
Periphery
Veil of Maya
Job for a Cowboy
Goatwhore
Exhumed
Cerebral Bore

Tour dates

2013

Headliner:
The Dillinger Escape Plan
Supporting bands:
Animals As Leaders
Periphery
Norma Jean
Cattle Decapitation
The Ocean
Revocation
Aeon
Rings of Saturn
Thy Art Is Murder

Tour dates:

2014

Headliner:
Morbid Angel
Supporting bands:
Dying Fetus
The Faceless
Thy Art Is Murder
Goatwhore
Origin
Decrepit Birth
Within The Ruins
Fallujah
Boreworm

Tour dates:

2014 (Canada)

Headliner:
The Faceless
Supporting bands:
Rings of Saturn
Archspire
Fallujah
Fatality (8/14-8/20)
Black Crown Initiate

Tour dates:

2015

Headliner:
 Arch Enemy

Supporting bands:
 Born of Osiris
 Veil of Maya
 The Acacia Strain
 Cattle Decapitation
 Beyond Creation

Obscura and After the Burial were originally scheduled to appear on the tour. Obscura dropped off due to visa issues and After the Burial dropped off due to the death of their guitarist Justin Lowe.

Tour dates:

2016

Headliner:
 Cannibal Corpse

Supporting bands:
 Nile
 After the Burial
 Suffocation
 Carnifex
 Revocation
 Krisiun
 Slaughter to Prevail
 Ingested
 Enterprise Earth

2017

Headliners:
The Black Dahlia Murder
Dying Fetus

Supporting bands:
The Faceless
Oceano
Origin
Rings of Saturn
Betraying the Martyrs
Lorna Shore
AngelMaker

The Black Dahlia Murder will play their 2007 album Nocturnal in its entirety for their 10th anniversary.

AngelMaker was voted in by fans during the Summer Slaughter Poll.

Slaughter to Prevail were initially announced on the bill, but their travel plans were delayed and they could not make the tour.

2018
Headliner:
Between the Buried and Me

Supporting bands:
Born of Osiris
Veil of Maya
Erra
The Agony Scene
Allegaeon
Terror Universal
Soreption
Entheos

Soreption only played a few tour dates and then dropped off due to unforeseen circumstances.

2019
Co-Headliners
Cattle Decapitation
Carnifex
The Faceless

Support bands:
Rivers of Nihil
Nekrogoblikon
Lorna Shore
Brand of Sacrifice

The Slaughter Survivors Tour 2011 (North America)

Headliner:
Conducting From The Grave
Support bands:
The Contortionist
Scale the Summit
Rings of Saturn
Volumes
Structures

Tour dates

The Slaughter Survivors Tour 2012 (North America)

Headliner:
Pathology
Support bands:
Enfold Darkness
Fallujah
Fit for an Autopsy
Aegaeon

Tour dates

Fan-voted openers

In 2011, the Summer Slaughter Tour offered their fans the opportunity to vote on who would open the tour. The choices for 2011 were Dawn of Ashes, Revocation, Neuraxis, Conducting From The Grave, The Contortionist, Within The Ruins, Volumes, Augury, 7 Horns 7 Eyes, Rings of Saturn, and Struc/tures. Within the Ruins ultimately received the most votes and thus won the opening spot for the tour. That same year Conducting From The Grave, The Contortionist, Rings of Saturn, Volumes, and Struc/tures all toured together on what was billed as the Slaughter Survivors Tour. This tour also included Scale the Summit, who had not been part of the voting.

For the 2012 edition of the Summer Slaughter Tour, fans were once again given the chance to vote on the opening act. The choices for 2012 were Aegaeon, Battlecross, Cerebral Bore, Enfold Darkness, Fallujah, Fit for an Autopsy, Hour of Penance, I Declare War, Pathology, and Vildhjarta. The opening slot for the 2012 tour went to Cerebral Bore, and Pathology, Enfold Darkness, Fallujah, Fit for an Autopsy, and Aegaeon also joined the 2012 Slaughter Survivors Tour.

The choices for the 2013 tour were Abiotic, As They Burn, Dark Sermon, Erra, Fit for an Autopsy, Howl, Intervals, Into the Flood, King Conquer, Last Chance To Reason, My Bitter End, Nekrogoblikon, Rings of Saturn, Syqem, Soreption, Today I Caught the Plague, and Thy Art Is Murder. Thy Art Is Murder was the chosen band. However, since they were nearly tied with Rings of Saturn by a few votes, the organizers decided to put both Rings of Saturn and Thy Art Is Murder on the bill. Vektor were put on the initial ballot by their record label without the band's knowledge or approval, and upon discovering this, had to withdraw due to incompatible scheduling. The Slaughter Survivors Tour did not occur in 2013, and did not return in 2014 either.

Summer Slaughter 2014 didn't see the tour offer an opportunity to vote on openers; rather, the opener was chosen by Headbang for the Highway showcase, and Boreworm was selected. Mayhem Festival also uses the Headbang for the Highway showcase to select bands.

Most appearances at The Summer Slaughter Tour

 The Faceless (11)
 Dying Fetus (6)
 Born of Osiris (6)
 Veil of Maya (6)
 As Blood Runs Black (4)
 Cattle Decapitation (4) 
 Necrophagist (4)      
 Rings of Saturn (4)
 Beneath the Massacre (3)
 The Black Dahlia Murder (3)
 Carnifex (3)
 Decrepit Birth (3)
 Origin (3)
 Whitechapel (3)

References

External links

Official MySpace
2007 & 2008 Tour Live Footage
News article
News article
News article
2008 lineup
2010 lineup news

Concert tours
Heavy metal festivals
Music festivals established in 2007